Samson Kiprotich Cherarkey  is a Kenyan politician who is the current senator representing Nandi County in the senate of Kenya.

Education 
Cherarkey attended Cheptarit Primary School, Mosoriot from 1996 to 2002 for his primary education, and later proceeded to Kapsabet Boysʼ High School, Nandi for his secondary education in the year 2003 to 2006. He went on to the prestigious School of Law of the Moi University, Eldoret, and graduated the year 2011 with a Bachelor of Laws (LLB) honours, and immediately enrolled at the Kenya School of Law for his Post Graduate Diploma in Law, and subsequently qualified as an advocate of the High Court of Kenya.

References 

Living people
Members of the Senate of Kenya
Year of birth missing (living people)